Hieracium alpinum, the alpine hawkweed, is a Eurasian plant species in the tribe Cichorieae within the family Asteraceae. It is native to Europe, and has also been found in Greenland.

One stalk will usually produce only one flower head, though occasionally 2 or 3. Each head has 80-120 yellow ray flowers but no disc flowers.

References

alpinum
Flora of Europe
Flora of Greenland
Plants described in 1753
Taxa named by Carl Linnaeus